Manongarivo Reserve is a wildlife reserve in the North-West of Madagascar in the region of Diana.

Manongarivo is home to both the Sambirano mouse lemur and the Sambirano woolly lemur.

Geography
The reserve has a surface of 64,356 ha and is situated at 35 km from Ambanja. It has an elevation of 1013 metres.

Flora and fauna
The vegetation is composed of low- and mid-altitude dense humid forest. Low-altitude, dry-transitional forest covers 18% of the reserve, and is dominated by trees of Canarium, Symphonia (and other species of Guttiferae), Terminalia, Ravensara and species of Sapotaceae, with smaller trees such as Phyllarthron in the subcanopy. There are about sixty species of birds in the reserve, thirty of which are endemic to Madagascar.

Some of the species found in the reserve are:

Fauna
 Eulemur macaco
 Microcebus sambiranensis
 Philepitta castanea
 Ploceus sakalava

Flora
 Bazzania descrescens
 Diplasiolejeunea cobrensis
 Drepanolejeunea geisslerae
 Microlejeunae fissistipula
 Lopholejeunea leioptera
 Plagiochila fracta
 Scistochila piligera
 Leucobryum parvulum
 Leucobryum sanctae-mariae
 Ochrobryum sakalavu
 Syrrhopodon cuneifolius

References

External links 
 Official site of the Park

Special reserves of Madagascar
Protected areas in Diana Region
Madagascar subhumid forests
Madagascar dry deciduous forests